Kirikuküla may refer to several places in Estonia:

Kirikuküla, Lääne County, village in Lihula Parish, Lääne County
Kirikuküla, Valga County, village in Helme Parish, Valga County
Kirikuküla, Võru County, village in Urvaste Parish, Võru County
Kaarma-Kirikuküla, village in Lääne-Saare Parish, Saare County, formerly known as Kirikuküla
Kärla-Kirikuküla, village in Lääne-Saare Parish, Saare County, formerly known as Kirikuküla